Najem Abdelrazak Al-Enazy Najem (born 30 November 1961) is a Kuwaiti discus thrower. He competed in the 1980 Summer Olympics.

References

1961 births
Living people
Athletes (track and field) at the 1980 Summer Olympics
Kuwaiti male athletes
Olympic athletes of Kuwait